Jerome Souers (born May 20, 1958) is an American football coach.  He is currently the head coach at Montana State University–Northern. He was formerly the head football coach at Northern Arizona University, a position he held from 1998 until 2018. Souers was selected as the 1999 Big Sky Conference Coach of the Year and was an Eddie Robinson Award finalist in 2003.

He was raised in Eugene, Oregon and attended North Eugene High School along with former NBA player and head coach Danny Ainge.

Head coaching record

Notes

References

External links
 Northern Arizona profile
 Southern Oregon profile

1958 births
Living people
High school football coaches in Oregon
Montana Grizzlies football coaches
Northern Arizona Lumberjacks football coaches
Portland State Vikings football coaches
Southern Oregon Raiders football coaches
Sportspeople from Eugene, Oregon
Western Washington Vikings football coaches